This is a list of notable cocktails, arranged alphabetically.

Numerical 

 20th century
 Seven and Seven or 7 & 7

A 
 Acapulco cocktail
 Adios motherfucker (a variation of Long Island iced tea)
 Adonis
 Aguaymanto sour
 Alabama slammer
 Alexander
 Amber moon
 Americano
 Ancient Mariner
 Angel face
 Aperol spritz
 Aperol sunrise (a variation of tequila sunrise)
 Apple-kneel
 Appletini (a.k.a. apple martini)
 Agua de Sevilla
 Agua de Valencia
 Agua loca
 Aqua Velva
 Arizona Biltmore (a variation of tequila sunrise)
 Astronaut sunrise (a variation of tequila sunrise)
 Astro pop
 Aviation

B 

 B-52 (and related B-50 series cocktails)
 B & B (brandy and Bénédictine)
 Baby Guinness
 Bacardi cocktail
 Backdraft (also a pepperdraft variation)
 Batida (traditionally made with cachaça)
 Bay breeze
 Bee's knees
 Bellini
 Between the sheets
 Bijou
 Black and tan
 Black nail
 Black Russian
 Black velvet
 Blackthorn
 Bloody Aztec
 Bloody Margaret
 Bloody Mary
 Blow my skull off
 BLT cocktail
 Blue blazer
 Blue Hawaii
 Blue Lagoon
 Blueberry tea
 Bobby Burns
 Boilermaker
 Boomerang (cocktail)
 Boulevardier
 Bourbon lancer
 Bramble
 Brandy Alexander
 Brandy sour / brandy daisy
 Brandy Manhattan
 Brandy sour (Cyprus)
 Brave bull
 Breakfast martini
 Bronx
 Brooklyn
 Brut cocktail
 Buck's fizz (a.k.a. mimosa)
 Bull shot
 Bumbo (also called a bombo or bumboo)
 Bushwacker
 Buttery nipple

C 

 Caesar
 Caipirinha
 Caipiroska (a.k.a. caipivodka)
 Caju amigo
 Cape Codder
 Carrot cake
 Casino
 Cement mixer
 Champagne cocktail
 Chatham Artillery punch
 Chi chi
 Chicago cocktail
 Chimayó cocktail
 Chocolate martini
 Churchill
 Cloister
 Clover Club cocktail
 Cobra's fang
 Cojito
 Colombia
 Colorado bulldog
 Common market
 Cooperstown cocktail
 Corpse reviver #2
 Cosmopolitan
 Cremat
 Cuba libre (a.k.a. rum and Coke)
 Cuban sunset
 Curaçao punch

D 

 Daiquiri
 Damn the weather
 Dark 'n' stormy
 Death in the Afternoon
 Derby
 Diki-diki
 Doctor
 Duck fart

E 

 El Presidente
 Enamorada sunrise (variation of tequila sunrise)

F 
 Fish house punch
 Flaming Doctor Pepper
 Flaming sambuca
 Flaming volcano
 Flirtini
 Florida sunrise (a variation of tequila sunrise)
 Fluffy critter
 Four score
 French 75
 French Connection
 Fuzzy navel

G 

 Gibson
 Gimlet
 Gin and tonic
 Gin fizz
 Gin pahit
 Gin sour
 Ginza Mary
 Glowtini
 Godfather
 Godmother
 Golden doublet
 Golden dream
 Grasshopper 
 Grateful Dead (a variation of the Long Island iced tea)
 Greyhound
 Grog
 Gunfire

H 
 Hangman's blood
 Hanky panky
 Harlem mugger
 Harvey Wallbanger
 Hennchata
 Herbsaint frappé
 Horse's neck
 Horsefeather
 Hot buttered rum
 Hugo
 Hurricane

I 

 Incredible Hulk
 Irish car bomb
 Irish coffee

J 
 Jack and Coke
 Jack Rose
 Jägerbomb
 Jagertee
 Japanese slipper
 John Collins
 Juan Collins
 Jungle juice

K 

 Kalimotxo (a.k.a. calimocho)
 Kamikaze
 Karsk
 Kensington Court special
 Kir
 Kir royal

L 
 Leite de Onça
 Lemon drop
 Lime Rickey
 Link up
 Long Beach iced tea (variation of Long Island iced tea)
 Long Island iced tea
 Lorraine
 Lynchburg lemonade

M 

 Macuá
 Mai-Tai
 Malecon
 Mango sour
 Manhattan
 Margarita
 Martini
 Matador
 Mauresque
 Mexica
 Mexican martini
 Michelada
 Midori sour
 Mimosa (a.k.a. Buck's fizz)
 Mint julep
 Mismo
 Missouri mule
 Mojito
 Mojito blanco
 Monkey gland
 Moonwalk
 Moscow mule
 Mr. Bali Hai
 Mudslide
 Mulled wine (glögg)
 My Fair Lady

N 

 Negroni
 Nixon

O 

 Oatmeal cookie
 Old Etonian
 Old fashioned
 Orange tundra
 Orgasm
 Ouzini

P 

 Painkiller
 Paloma
 Panama
 Paradise
 Pastis
 Perroquet
 Pegu
 Pimm's cup (incl. variants using other Pimm's products)
 Piña colada
 Pink gin
 Pink lady
 Pisco sour
 Planter's punch
 Polar bear
 Porchcrawler
 Porn star martini
 Porto flip
 Prince of Wales

Q 

 Q.B. Cooler
 Queen Mary
 Quentão
 Quick fuck

R 

 Rabo-de-galo
 Ramos gin fizz
 Rebujito (dry sherry with soda)
 Red Russian
 Redheaded slut
 Revelation
 Rob Roy
 Rose Kennedy
 Rossini
 Rourou
 Royal arrival
 Royal Bermuda
 Ruby dutchess
 Rum swizzle
 Rusty nail

S 

 Sake bomb
 Salty dog
 Sangria
 Savoy affair
 Savoy corpse reviver
 Sazerac
 Schneemaß
 Scotch and soda
 Screwdriver
 Sea breeze
 Sex on the beach
 Shandy
 Shirley Temple Black
 Sidecar
 Singapore sling
 Skittle bomb
 Slippery nipple
 Snakebite
 Snowball – Advocaat and carbonated lemonade
 Springbokkie
 Spritzer
 Stinger
 Suffering bastard
 Sumatra Kula

T 

 Tamagozake
 Tamango
 Tequila slammer
 Tequila sour
 Tequila sunrise
 Tequila sunset (variation of tequila sunrise)
 Test pilot
 The Blenheim
 The last word
 Three wise men
 Ti' punch
 Tinto de Verano
 Tokyo iced tea (variation of Long Island iced tea)
 Tom and Jerry
 Tom Collins
 Tomate
 Tommy's margarita
 Toronto
 Trumptini
 Tschunk
 Tuxedo

U 

 U-boot
 Up to date

V 
 Vampiro
 Vesper
 Vodka gimlet
 Vodka martini
 Vodka sunrise (variation of tequila sunrise)

W 
 Ward 8
 Whiskey sour
 Whisky Mac
 White lady or Delilah
 White Russian
 Wolfram
 Woo woo

Y 

 Yellow bird
 Yorsh

Z 

 Zombie
 Zurracapote

See also
 List of cocktails – sorted by type
 

Lists of cocktails